Man Enough (also known as Man Enough: The Ultimate Social Adventure) is a 1993 dating video game from Tsunami Media.

Reception

Entertainment Weekly gave the game a D+ rating, stating: "Man Enough doesn't have the courage of its own sleaziness, as the final encounters are all interrupted before anything happens. Expensive frustration, then-and God help the boob who tries these sub-Club Med lines out on human females."

The game sold 30,000 copies.

References

1993 video games
Dating sims
DOS games
DOS-only games
Single-player video games
Tsunami Games games